Cleistanthus is a plant genus of the family Phyllanthaceae, tribe Bridelieae, first described as a genus in 1848. It is widespread in much of the Old World Tropics in Asia, Africa, Australia, and various oceanic islands. Cleistanthus collinus is known for being toxic and may be the agent of homicides or suicides.

Species

References

  
 

 
Phyllanthaceae genera